Hesperolinon is a genus in the family Linaceae, whose common genus names are dwarf-flax or western flax, in reference to their distribution along the west coast of North America.  There are 13 known species within this genus of wildflowers, most of which are limited to serpentine soil habitats within California, United States.  These annual plants are thought to be mostly self-pollinating.

Description
Stems vary between five and fifty centimeters in length, with thread-like to linear leaves generally alternate: the leaves are typically not planar and not clasping.  Cymes are characteristically open and pedicels are somewhat thread-like and ascending.  The flower has five sepals, whose margins may be minutely gland-toothed.  Five petals are widely spreading between one and twelve millimeters in dimension. These yellow, white or rose colored petals each manifest three minute scales at the inner base. There are five stamens and four to six ovary chambers; styles number two to three. Fruits have a smooth surface exterior.

Species
Hesperolinon adenophyllum - glandular western flax
Hesperolinon bicarpellatum - bicarpellate western flax
Hesperolinon breweri - Brewer's western flax
Hesperolinon californicum - California western flax
Hesperolinon clevelandii - Allen Springs dwarf flax
Hesperolinon congestum - Marin western flax
Hesperolinon didymocarpum - Lake County western flax
Hesperolinon disjunctum - Coast Range western flax
Hesperolinon drymarioides - drymary western flax
Hesperolinon micranthum - smallflower western flax
Hesperolinon serpentinum
Hesperolinon sharsmithiae - Sharsmith's western flax
Hesperolinon spergulinum - slender western flax
Hesperolinon tehamense - Paskenta Grade western flax, Tehama western flax

References

External links
Jepson Manual Treatment

 
Malpighiales genera
Flora of California